Remo Sabattini (10 June 1926 – 28 October 2009) was an Italian racing cyclist. He rode in the 1950 Tour de France.

References

1926 births
2009 deaths
Italian male cyclists
Place of birth missing